Stegath James Dorr (born 3 June 1973) is an American screenwriter, film actor and producer, credited under the screen name James Wagnor. He is noted for forming the commercial film industry in Oman beginning in 2006 with his association with Kamel Krifa and introducing the concept of the "global ensemble cast" which integrates a mixed international cast of actors who are each stars within their own countries to leverage the appeal of a film in different markets. According to the Oman Daily Observer, the country's largest English-language newspaper, Dorr's work in Oman has been instrumental in "sparking international interest in the Sultanate's potential as an exotic locale for film shoots."  While Oman has long appealed to filmmakers for its extraordinary geography, obtaining permission to film in the country has been very difficult in the past and has previously only been granted to documentary filmmakers.

Dorr is credited for writing, producing, and starring in Pirate's Blood, "the first English-language feature film to be shot in Oman".  Dorr is also noted for casting Canadian adult video actress Sunny Leone in Pirate's Blood, her first mainstream Bollywood film, along with longtime Filipina movie star Isabel Granada and Bollywood actor Nishant Sagar.
Dorr is also the cousin of Laurette Spang-McCook, who played Cassiopeia in the original Battlestar Galactica. Dorr was schoolmates with Swedish actress MyAnna Buring at the American British Academy.

Career

Early career
Dorr was born near Detroit.  In Southeast Michigan he began his career as an extra in the 1985 HIV AIDS social commentary horror film The Carrier and found work as a gofer for the crew at age eleven alongside fellow Detroit native Bruce Campbell, employed on the same production as a sound editor.   Dorr's father was a government scientist whose research shifted his family around the world, and Dorr was raised in Africa and Asia and the Middle East.  During high school, he and later BBC cameraman Nick Wright made their first student film together.  At age eighteen, Dorr briefly served in the USIS Branch of the American Embassy in Muscat under Suzie Shaeffer before returning to Michigan to attend a community college.  In 1993, he enrolled in Central Michigan University to study journalism and film production. Dorr was employed as the staff film critic for the CM Life entertainment column from 1993 to 1994, his editor was Tom Root, later creator of Robot Chicken. After leaving the United States in the late 1990s, Dorr was employed from 1999 to 2000 as a film reviewer for Gulf-based Apex Publishing. In Canada, Dorr was employed at the North Bay Center for the Performing Arts from 2002 to 2003 while completing a degree in Journalism and Economics at Canadore College.  From 2003 to 2006, Dorr worked as a writer and co-producer of documentary films and commercials with Impact Films in Muscat, Oman.

Current career
Dorr was based in Oman.  The Ann Arbor News reported that Dorr is working on the "first-ever Hollywood feature to be primarily shot in that country - a film called Brothers Till the End" and that "shooting is scheduled to begin in 2010."
Since 2006, Dorr has worked on several Gulf-based productions as a screenwriter, actor and production manager on several feature film projects, including Blood Desert, a political satire filmed around 2004-2005 which was screened at the Muscat Film Festival in 2006 to positive responses and later became available on pirate and bootleg DVD.  The following year Dorr wrote, co-produced and appeared the film Pirate's Blood, under the screen name of James Wagnor. 
Dorr developed a "revenge film" project entitled Razor to be set and shot in the Philippines.  Dorr described Razor as a commercial project, but the production was subsequently canceled in preproduction.  While his dream project "is a project I am planning on street children, which may or may not make money but will touch the hearts and minds of people.".  
In late 2010, Dorr was reunited with Sunny Leone in the Philippines for a new horror film entitled Black Shama which commenced filming in December on location in Cebu and wrapped in June 2011.  The film was later acquired by Australian producer and distributor John Klyza.

References

10. Kotwani, Hiren 2012:  "Dorr to Cash in On Sunny Leone Craze", Mumbai Midday, April 6, 2012
11. Balbuena, Vanessa 2012:  "Film Shot in Cebu Causes Bollywood Furor", The Freeman May 3, 2012

External links
 
 Pirate's Blood at the Internet Movie Database.

1974 births
American expatriates in Oman
Living people
Male actors from Detroit
Canadore College alumni